Henry William Fischer (born January 11, 1940 in Yonkers, New York) is a former pitcher in Major League Baseball who played with three different teams between 1962 and 1967.

Fischer was signed by the Milwaukee Braves as a free agent in 1959 out of the Seton Hall University. He entered the majors in 1962 with the Braves, playing for them for four full seasons in Milwaukee and a half-season in Atlanta, before joining the Cincinnati Reds (1966) and Boston Red Sox (1966–1967). With the 1964 Braves, he posted career-highs in wins (11), starts (28), complete games (9), and innings pitched (168).

In a six-season career, Fischer posted a 30–39 record with 369 strikeouts and a 4.23 ERA in 168 appearances, including 77 starts, 14 complete games, five shutouts, seven saves, and 546 innings of work.

References

External links

Retrosheet

1940 births
Living people
Atlanta Braves players
Baseball players from New York (state)
Boston Red Sox players
Cedar Rapids Braves players
Cincinnati Reds players
Eau Claire Braves players
Louisville Colonels (minor league) players
Major League Baseball pitchers
Milwaukee Braves players
Seton Hall Pirates baseball players
Sportspeople from Yonkers, New York
Toronto Maple Leafs (International League) players